TREAT-NMD (treat NeuroMuscular Disease) is a global academic network that focuses on advancing research in neuromuscular disorders. It was established in 2007 with its coordination centre at the Newcastle University. As of 2018, the network comprises over a hundred research centres and patient organisations from 54 countries as well as independent academics and patient representatives. The network's aim is to provide infrastructure to accelerating research through supporting collaboration between its members. Its main goals include improving trial-readiness worldwide, advancing patient diagnosis and care and accelerating pre-clinical research.

Through patient registries, TREAT-NMD provides genotype–phenotype correlation between genetic mutations and neuromuscular disease burden.

References

Further reading

Medical research organizations